Wife is a 1953 Japanese drama film directed by Mikio Naruse. It is based on Fumiko Hayashi's novel Chairo no me (1950).

Cast
Ken Uehara as Toichi
Mieko Takamine as Mihoko
Yatsuko Tan'ami as Fusako
Sanae Takasugi as Setsuko
Rentarō Mikuni as Tadashi
Michiyo Aratama as Yoshimi
Chieko Nakakita as Eiko

Production
Wife was part of a series of six films by Naruse based on works by writer Hayashi, made between 1951 and 1962. Like Repast, the theme of Wife involved a couple trapped with each other and, like in Lightning, an unhappy family.

References

External links

1953 films
1953 drama films
1950s Japanese-language films
Japanese black-and-white films
Films directed by Mikio Naruse
Toho films
Films based on Japanese novels
Films based on works by Fumiko Hayashi
Films scored by Ichirō Saitō
Films produced by Sanezumi Fujimoto
Japanese drama films
1950s Japanese films